The Us + Them Tour was a concert tour by rock musician Roger Waters. The tour visited the United States, Canada, New Zealand, Australia and countries in Europe and Latin America, showcasing songs from Waters' career with Pink Floyd and his 2017 album Is This the Life We Really Want? It opened on 26 May 2017 in Kansas City, United States and ended on 9 December 2018 in Monterrey, Mexico.

Background
In mid-October 2016, Waters announced that he would return to North America in 2017 with a pioneering new tour named "Us + Them", stating: "We are going to take a new show on the road, the content is very secret. It'll be a mixture of stuff from my long career, stuff from my years with Pink Floyd, some new things. Probably 75% of it will be old material and 25% will be new, but it will be all connected by a general theme. It will be a cool show, I promise you. It'll be spectacular like all my shows have been." The tour is named after the track "Us and Them", from Pink Floyd's 1973 album The Dark Side of the Moon.

Tour band

 Roger Waters – lead vocals, bass, acoustic guitar, electric guitar on "Welcome to the Machine" and "Picture That"
 Dave Kilminster – acoustic and electric guitars, talk box, backing vocals
 Jon Carin – piano, keyboards, programming, lap steel guitar, acoustic and electric guitars, backing vocals
 Gus Seyffert – acoustic and electric guitars, bass, backing vocals
 Jonathan Wilson – acoustic and electric guitars, lead and backing vocals
 Drew Erickson – piano, keyboards, Hammond organ (withdrew from tour before Newark date, due to injury)
 Bo Koster – piano, keyboards, Hammond organ (replaced an injured Erickson, from Newark date onwards)
 Ian Ritchie – saxophone, bass
 Joey Waronker – drums, percussion
 Jess Wolfe – backing vocals, percussion, lead vocals on "The Great Gig in the Sky" and "Mother"
 Holly Laessig – backing vocals, percussion, lead vocals on "The Great Gig in the Sky" and "Mother"

Set list

The following set list was obtained from the concert held on September 12, 2017 at the Barclays Center in Brooklyn. It does not represent all concerts for the duration of the tour. 

Set 1
 "Speak to Me"
 "Breathe"
 "One of These Days"
 "Time / "Breathe" (Reprise)
 "The Great Gig in the Sky"
 "Welcome to the Machine"
 "When We Were Young"
 "Déjà Vu"
 "The Last Refugee"
 "Picture That"
 "Wish You Were Here"
 "The Happiest Days of Our Lives"
 "Another Brick in the Wall, Part 2"
 "Another Brick in the Wall, Part 3"

Set 2
 "Dogs"
 "Pigs (Three Different Ones)"
 "Money"
 "Us and Them"
 "Smell the Roses"
 "Brain Damage"
 "Eclipse"
Encore
"Vera"
"Bring the Boys Back Home"
 "Comfortably Numb"

Reception
As of July 2017, the Us + Them Tour, which had cost $4 million to produce, had grossed over $25 million in North America and ranked 19th in highest grossing shows in North America for that year. The tour has been highly praised for its setlist, which is heavy on songs from Waters' tenure in Pink Floyd, along with its visuals and technology. 

One portion of the show features extensive anti-Donald Trump imagery, which led some attendees to boo or even walk out of the show.  Waters responded to the anti-Trump critics by saying, "I find it slightly surprising that anybody could have been listening to my songs for 50 years without understanding", and said to those critics if they didn't like what he was doing, "Go see Katy Perry or watch the Kardashians. I don't care." Waters also said that due to his anti-Trump images that he lost sponsors such as American Express, who refused to have their company associated with his shows in the U.S., although they are still sponsoring the tour in Canada, according to Waters.

Waters also was met with some backlash, boycotts and even attempts to cancel his show by some lawmakers in various cities due to his anti-Israel boycott which some felt was anti-semitic. Prior to his performances in Washington, D.C., the Jewish Community Relations Council of Greater Washington produced a video criticizing Waters' support of BDS, the boycott, divestment and sanctions movement that compares the country's treatment of Palestinians to apartheid. In October 2016, Waters lost $4 million in sponsorship after American Express refused to fund the tour due to his anti-Israel rhetoric at a previous festival sponsored by the financial company. In November 2016, Citibank joined American Express in cutting ties to Waters.

Movie and live album
The Amsterdam shows of 18 – 23 June 2018 at the Ziggo Dome were filmed for Roger Waters: Us + Them. The movie was premiered at Venice Film Festival in 2019. A live album with the songs from the movie was released on 2 October 2020.

Tour dates

Notes

References

Roger Waters concert tours
2017 concert tours
2018 concert tours